Tales of Aravorn: Seasons of the Wolf is a fantasy RPG visual novel by Italian studio Winter Wolves. The game was released on November 15, 2014, and is a spin-off of Loren The Amazon Princess, which is set in the same universe. The game works for the Android, iOS, Linux, Mac OS, and Microsoft Windows platforms. A port for the Nintendo Switch is set to be released at a later date.

Gameplay
Similar to Loren The Amazon Princess, the game offers a mix of classic visual novel gameplay, with RPG elements. The player reads through the story and occasionally has to fight against fantasy monsters. At the beginning the player can choose between a male and a female elven protagonist. Furthermore, it offers a variety of romance options with the party members, including homosexual relationships, and has different endings, based on the choices of the player and the relationships.

Battles can take place between the player's party and a party of enemies, with a maximum of six characters on each side. Each party consists of a front row, that is typically occupied by warrior type characters and can be attacked by anyone, and a back row, which typically holds weaker ranged and magical characters, that melee characters can only attack if the front row is unoccupied, in which case all on the back row will be forced to the front. Characters are able to swap places with others, or can move into unoccupied spaces on their turn, and warriors can gain the ability to force a character to swap with the one behind them.

Characters take it in turns to attack, with their speed, as well as the moves they use, determining how long they must wait. When a character's turn comes up, they have the choice of either attacking an enemy with their equipped weapon or abilities, using an ability to support the party, using an item for either healing or offense, or switching places. Should everyone in the player's party be killed, the player can reload a previous save. The player does not have the option of fleeing a battle, but should they win, the health and MP of all characters will be completely refilled, except at certain points of the story. As the player gains more followers, exceeding the maximum number of people they can have in a battle, they can reorganise the battle group outside of battles.

Plot
Following Althea and Shea, the game plays over the course of the four seasons. They travel along with others from the ice-shrouded town of Ninim to the desert-wrapped city of Dingirra to the storm-shrouded port of Shacklesplit.

Characters
 Althea (voiced by Jessica Young)
The female protagonist of Tales of Aravorn: Seasons of the Wolf.

 Shea (voiced by David Young)
The male protagonist of Tales of Aravorn: Seasons of the Wolf.

 Chalassa (voiced by Michelle Tabula)
A Bloodskin assassin.

 Jariel (voiced by Patrick M. Seymour)
An Elven bard and a seasoned traveler.

 Krimm (voiced by Elissa Park)
A human barbarian.

 Riley (voiced by Kamran Nikhad)
A human illusionist.

 Rowinda (voiced by Miranda Gauvin)
A human warlock.

 Vaelis (voiced by Nicholas Andrew Loui)
A Snow Elven mercenary.

Development
The game was created with Ren'Py. It features a theme song by Boossara, composed by Matthew Myers: Seasons of the Wolf. The original idea and the storyboard was invented by Celso Riva, while the writing was done by Götz Heinrich. The art was done by Shiver M., Slamet Mujono, Sheryn Ng, Stéphan Lemineur, Peter Petkov, and Therese M. Yucamco. Kevin Greenlee composed the original soundtrack, while Ayu Sakata was responsible for the battle voice production.

Expansion
The expansion titled Bad Blood was released on April 24, 2015. It includes additional story content after the end of the game and continues the plot. Furthermore, the DLC includes new mini games and some scenes change based on whom the player romanced.

Reception
RPGamer gave a rating of 3.0 of 5 points to the game and wrote: "If forced to choose between Seasons Of The Wolf and its predecessor, then Loren The Amazon Princess would get the nod purely for its more rewarding overall storyline and larger set of intriguing characters. However, Seasons Of The Wolf provides a decent follow-up, and those who have enjoyed Winter Wolves' previous excursions or other visual novels should find it well worth the fifteen to twenty hours it takes to get through."

Twinfinite gave 4 out of 5 points with reviewer Mike Geib writing: "Overall Seasons of the Wolf is a solid RPG. With excellent art, fun strategic combat, visual novel storytelling methods, and interesting characters it checks all the boxes required for a solid experience. Some might be turned away initially by the presentation, but Seasons of the Wolf is a must-play for fans of the RPG genre."

In 2014, the original song was named "Best Song" by VNs Now!

References

External links
 Official website for Tales of Aravorn: Seasons of the Wolf
 

2014 video games
Linux games
Windows games
Adventure games
Indie video games
Ren'Py games
Android (operating system) games
MacOS games
Visual novels
Video games developed in Italy